London Coaches was a former bus and coach operator operating open top tourist services in London and commuter services from Kent to London.

History
London Coaches originated from the London Transport Tours and Charters division. In January 1986 London Transport revamped the division and formed the Original London Transport Sightseeing Tour brand, to operate a fleet of 50 modified open and closed topped AEC Routemaster buses, on sightseeing tours of London.

In April 1988 London Coaches commenced operating a service from New Ash Green, Kent to London following the collapse of Bexleyheath Transport. This resulted in some buses being outstationed at Kentish Bus' Dartford depot, this moved in 1989 to Northfleet.
 
The business unit was based originally at Battersea garage, before moving to Wandsworth garage in October 1988.

In April 1989 in preparation for privatisation of London bus services, London Buses was separated into different business units and London Coaches was formed with a fleet of 85 buses. London Coaches was the first of the operating units to be sold in May 1992 to a management buyout headed by Pat Waterman with 111 vehicles. Upon privatisation the Pullmans Group Limited was formed and traded as London Coaches. 

London Coaches post privatisation was forced to drop the "Transport" in its Original London Sightseeing Tour core business element. London Coaches Limited was split into two operating unit when it opened London Coaches (Kent) Limited, in Northfleet. London Coaches (Kent) had all its commuter coach services transferred from Wandsworth garage, when in 1993 London Coaches tendered to operate bus routes under contract to London Regional Transport.

In December 1993 London Coaches won the contract to run the route 52. After a lot of logistical, vehicle and staffing problems, in July 1994 London Coaches purchased Atlas Bus & Coach Company and transferred the route to Atlas's Willesden Junction garage. In November 1994, Atlas Bus & Coach Company was sold to Metroline along with route 52/N52.

In January 1994 seven former express 3-axle MCW Metroliners were purchased and converted to open top configuration. In March 1997 Blue Triangle's open top business was purchased. Route 726 was transferred from London Coaches at Wandsworth, to London Coaches (Kent) at Dartford. Upon retendering in December 1997 it passed to Capital Logistics.

The company continued to operate The Original London Sightseeing Tour, trading as The Original Tour until December 1997, when it was sold to Arriva. London Coaches (Kent) was retained by the existing owners, before ceasing in March 2003.

London Coaches Training
London Coaches had its own training section that operated from Wandsworth garage offering PCV and HGV training.

References

Former London bus operators